José Oliva (March 3, 1971 – December 22, 1997) was a professional baseball player who played in the Major Leagues primarily as a third baseman from 1994 to 1995. Oliva had three daughters, Laura Oliva, Tiana Oliva, and Yeika Oliva. On December 22, 1997, Oliva died from multiple injuries when his car overturned along the San Cristóbal highway in the Dominican Republic. Oliva was the last St. Louis Cardinal to wear jersey number 42, which has since been retired league-wide by Major League Baseball in honor of Jackie Robinson.

See also
 List of baseball players who died during their careers

External links

1971 births
1997 deaths
Atlanta Braves players
St. Louis Cardinals players
Brother Elephants players
Major League Baseball third basemen
Road incident deaths in the Dominican Republic
Dominican Republic expatriate baseball players in Taiwan
Dominican Republic expatriate baseball players in the United States
Butte Copper Kings players
Gastonia Rangers players
Gulf Coast Rangers players
Louisville Redbirds players
Charlotte Rangers players
Richmond Braves players
Tulsa Drillers players